This is a list of Australian magazines including those that are no longer published.

Arts and entertainment 

 The Adelaide Review (defunct)
 Australasian Photo-Review (defunct)
 Australian Art Review (2003–2013)
Australian Arts Review
 Foxtel
Limelight
Look
 Pix (defunct)

Children
K-Zone

Computers and technology

APC
Atomic (defunct)
Australian NetGuide (defunct)
Electronics Today International (defunct)
Free Access Magazine
Macworld Australia (defunct)
 Mega Zone (defunct)
Nintendo Magazine System (defunct)
Official PlayStation Magazine
PC PowerPlay
PC World
TechLife
Your Computer (defunct)

Consumer advocacy
Choice

Food and cooking
 Donna Hay Magazine
 Gourmet Traveller

General interest
In Australia
Frankie

Gossip
Who
OK! Magazine (Australia)
TV Week

Health

Men

 Australian Men's Fitness
 Esquire
 GQ
 Australian Men's Health
 Men's Journal

Women

General
 LivingNow

Hobby and interest

Home and garden
 Belle
 Better Homes and Gardens
 Decoration and Glass (defunct)

Radio and electronics
  Electronics Australia (defunct)
 Electronics Today International (defunct)
 Silicon Chip
 Wireless Weekly (defunct)

Indigenous Australians

Australian Aborigines Advocate (1901–1908)
Black Australian News (1972)
Black News Service (1975–1977)
Churinga (1964–1970), briefly revived as Alchuringa (1971–1972)
 Dawn and New Dawn (1969–1975)
Identity (1971–1982)
 Irabina (1965–1971)
Koori Bina (1976–1979)
Koori Mail (1991–present)
Land Rights News (1976–present)
National Indigenous Times (2002–present)
 Smoke Signals (1957–?)
Westralian Aborigine (1954–1957)

LGBT
 Blue
 Curve
 DNA
 Lesbians on the Loose
 QNews
 Queensland Pride
 Star Observer

Men's interest

Australian Playboy
Ralph

Military
Aussie: The Australian Soldiers' Magazine

Motor vehicle
Motor
Wheels

Music

Australian Musician
BMA Magazine
Cyclic Defrost
Fast Forward (defunct)
Go-Set (defunct)
Juke Magazine (defunct)
Limelight
The Music Network
Resident Advisor
Rip It Up (defunct)
 Rock Australia Magazine (RAM) (defunct)
Rolling Stone Australia
Stealth magazine (defunct)
Triple J Magazine

News
Avenewz Magazine, Australia
The Bulletin
The Diplomat
Dissent
The Hoopla
National Observer
New Internationalist Australia
News Weekly
Nexus

Politics
 Arena
 Fresh Underground Culture Magazine (FUCM)
 The Monthly
 Overland
 The Socialist

Pornography

Religion
 Annals Australasia
 Signs of the Times

Satire
Fresh Underground Culture Magazine (FUCM)

Science
Australasian Anthropological Journal
Australasian Science
Australian Geographic
Cosmos
Science of man and Australasian anthropological journal

Science fiction and fantasy
Andromeda Spaceways Inflight Magazine
Aurealis

Sports

General or multiple sports
Inside Sport
Pop Magazine

Australian rules
AFL Record
Football Budget
South Australian Football Budget

Basketball
Handle magazine

Cricket
ABC Cricket Book

Firearms
Australian & New Zealand Handgun
Australian Shooter

Golf
Inside Golf

Martial Arts
Fightmag

Motor vehicle
Australian 4WD Action
Auto Action

Rugby league
Big League
Rugby League Review
Rugby League Week (defunct)

Sailing
Australian Sailing magazine

Soccer
FourFourTwo
Soccer International

Surfing
Australia's Surfing Life
Surfing World Magazine
Tracks

Teen interest
Dolly (defunct)
Girlfriend

Transport
Australian Aviation
Australian Bus
Australian Bus Panorama
Australian Railway History
Australasian Bus & Coach
Australasian Transport News
Catch Point
Fleetline (defunct)
Freight & Container Transportation (defunct)
Green over Red (defunct)
Light Railways
Motive Power
Network (defunct)
Newsrail
Railway Digest
Railway Transportation (defunct)
Rattler
Roundhouse
Sunshine Express
Tasmanian Rail News
The Recorder (defunct)
Truck & Bus Transportation (defunct)

Travel
The Open Road
Qantas: The Australian Way
Road Ahead
RoyalAuto
Walkabout (defunct)
Holidays with Kids

Underground/alternativeOz (defunct)

Video gameAtomicAustralian GamePro (defunct)Grab It Indie Games MagazineHyperMega ZoneNintendo Magazine System (defunct)PC PowerPlayPlayStation Official Magazine – AustraliaWildlife

Women's magazinesAustralian Women's WeeklyCleo (defunct)HepburnNew IdeaNew WeeklyPOL Magazine (defunct)RusshTake 5That's Life!WFOWoman (defunct)WomankindWoman's Day''

See also

List of newspapers in Australia
Media of Australia

References 

List of Australian Magazines
Australian literature-related lists
Australia
Lists of companies of Australia